Şehsuvar may refer to:

People
Şehsuvar Sultan (1682 – April 1756), a Serbian noblewoman who was the concubine of the Ottoman Sultan Mustafa II (r. 1695–1703) and Valide Sultan to their son Osman III (r. 1754–1757).
Şehsuvar Paşa
Şehsuvar Bey
Şehsuvar Bey Çerkez
Şehsuvar Menemencioğlu
Hüseyin Şehsuvar
Şehsuvar Paşa-zâde

Buildings
Şehsuvar Bey Mosque

See also
Şehsuvar, Elâzığ
Shahsuvar (disambiguation)

Turkish given names